Andrea Rica Nahmod (born 1964) is a mathematician at University of Massachusetts, Amherst. She is known for her work in nonlinear partial differential equations and other areas of nonlinear analysis.

Career
Nahmod received her Ph.D. from Yale University in 1991. She went to work as a research fellow at Macquarie University from 1992 to 1994, followed by positions at University of Texas, Austin, the Mathematical Sciences Research Institute, and the Institute for Advanced Study, before coming to work at University of Massachusetts, Amherst in 1998.

Awards and honors
In 2013, Nahmod became a Simons Fellow.

In 2014, Nahmod became a fellow of the American Mathematical Society. The society cited her “contributions to nonlinear Fourier analysis, harmonic analysis, and partial differential equations, as well as service to the mathematical community.”

Nahmod was named MSRI Simons Professor for 2015-2016.

Selected publications
 Nahmod, Andrea; Stefanov, Atanas; Uhlenbeck, Karen. On Schrödinger maps. Comm. Pure Appl. Math. 56 (2003), no. 1, 114–151.
 Auscher, Pascal; McIntosh, Alan; Nahmod, Andrea. Holomorphic functional calculi of operators, quadratic estimates and interpolation. Indiana Univ. Math. J. 46 (1997), no. 2, 375–403.
 Gilbert, John E.; Nahmod, Andrea R. Bilinear operators with non-smooth symbol. I. J. Fourier Anal. Appl. 7 (2001), no. 5, 435–467.
 Nahmod, Andrea; Stefanov, Atanas; Uhlenbeck, Karen. On the well-posedness of the wave map problem in high dimensions. Comm. Anal. Geom. 11 (2003), no. 1, 49–83.

References

Living people
1964 births
American women mathematicians
20th-century American mathematicians
21st-century American mathematicians
Fellows of the American Mathematical Society
20th-century women mathematicians
21st-century women mathematicians
20th-century American women
21st-century American women